The 2016 Spa-Francorchamps GP3 Series round was a GP3 Series motor race held on 27 and 28 August 2016 at the Circuit de Spa-Francorchamps in Belgium. It was the sixth round of the 2016 GP3 Series. The race weekend supported the 2016 Belgian Grand Prix.

Background
Óscar Tunjo will taking the third entry at Jenzer Motorsport to return to the category. Another driver change for this weekend was in the Koiranen GP camp where Red Bull junior driver Niko Kari would be replacing Ralph Boschung.

Classification

Qualifying
Charles Leclerc took his first pole position since the Red Bull Ring round with a time over three-tenths faster than his nearest rival, Hughes. Nyck de Vries took third with a time just under half a second slower than Leclerc.

Race 1
Charles Leclerc took another win to inch further ahead in the championship, finishing 2.3 seconds ahead of Jake Dennis and 15.4 seconds ahead of teammate, Nyck de Vries.

Notes
1. – Calderón was given a 10-second penalty for causing a collision with Niko Kari.
2. – Tunjo was given a 10-second penalty for a dangerous re-entry onto the circuit, causing a collision with Konstantin Tereshchenko.
3. – Tereshchenko was given a 10-second penalty for forcing Tunjo off of the circuit.

Race 2
Jack Aitken took his first GP3 win in a tight battle between himself and Antonio Fuoco. Haas F1 development driver, Santino Ferrucci achieved his first podium, 5.8 seconds adrift of the leader.

Notes
1. – Maini was given a ten-second penalty after causing a collision with Alexander Albon.

Standings after the round

Drivers' Championship standings

Teams' Championship standings

 Note: Only the top five positions are included for both sets of standings.

See also 
 2016 Belgian Grand Prix
 2016 Spa-Francorchamps GP2 Series round

References

External links 
 Official website of GP3 Series

|- style="text-align:center"
|width="35%"|Previous race:
|width="30%"|GP3 Series2016 season
|width="40%"|Next race:

2016
GP3
August 2016 sports events in Europe
Spa-Francorchamps